Henderson Haverfield Carson (October 25, 1893 – October 5, 1971) was a U.S. Representative from Ohio for two non-consecutive terms in the 1940s.

Biography 
Born on a farm near Cadiz, Ohio, Carson attended the public and high schools.
Cleveland (Ohio) Law School and Baldwin-Wallace College at Berea, Ohio, LL.B., 1919.
He became affiliated with the legal department of the Pennsylvania Railroad Co. in 1915.
Enlisted in the Field Artillery in 1918.
He was transferred to Base Hospital, One Hundred and Nineteenth Unit, Camp Zachary Taylor, Kentucky, and served there until honorably discharged in 1919 as a corporal.
He was admitted to the bar in 1919 and commenced practice in Canton, Ohio, in 1922.
He served as member of the faculty of McKinley Law School 1926–1942, where he received his J.D. degree.

Congress 
Carson was elected as a Republican to the Seventy-eighth Congress (January 3, 1943 – January 3, 1945).
He was an unsuccessful candidate for reelection in 1944 to the Seventy-ninth Congress.

Carson was elected to the Eightieth Congress (January 3, 1947 – January 3, 1949).
He was an unsuccessful candidate for reelection in 1948 to the Eighty-first Congress.

Later career and death 
He resumed the practice of law in Canton, Ohio, and Washington, D.C.
Resided in Canton, Ohio, where he died October 5, 1971.
He was interred in West Lawn Cemetery.

References
 
 

Republican Party members of the United States House of Representatives from Ohio
1893 births
1971 deaths
Baldwin Wallace University alumni
People from Cadiz, Ohio
Burials at West Lawn Cemetery
United States Army soldiers
Politicians from Canton, Ohio
Cleveland–Marshall College of Law alumni
American military personnel of World War I
20th-century American politicians
Lawyers from Canton, Ohio
20th-century American lawyers